Alexandro is both a masculine given name and a surname originating in the Americas as a combination of the English Alexander with the Spanish Alejandro. Notable people with the name Alexandro include:

Alexandro Álvarez (born 1977), Mexican footballer
Alexandro Alves do Nascimento (1974–2012), Brazilian footballer
Alexandro Cavagnera (born 1998), Belgian footballer
Alexandro da Silva Batista (born 1986), Brazilian footballer
Ted Alexandro (born 1969), American comedian

See also
Alejandro
Alexandre (disambiguation)
Alexandros (disambiguation)

Masculine given names